Carlos Eusebio de Ayo (ca. 1830 – ca. 1910) was Mayor of Ponce, Puerto Rico, from 12 April 1890 to 2 January 1893.

Mayoral term
Carlos Eusebio de Ayo Rouez was named mayor of Ponce by governor José Lasso y Pérez on 12 April 1890. While acting as mayor of Ponce, on 7 September 1892, all stores and shops in Ponce shut down in protest for the high tariffs imposed on commerce and industry.  The conflict was resolved 3 days later, on 10 September.

Ayo is remembered as the mayor who liked to throw banquets for the governor and his staff whenever they visited the city of Ponce, and his public works were none. Mayor Ayo dependent heavily on his assistant, Secretary Joaquin Salgado, to make decisions and run city hall. To a point, the mayor was Salgado's puppet and. in a sense, it was his assistant Salgado who ran City Hall.

See also

 List of Puerto Ricans
 List of mayors of Ponce, Puerto Rico

Notes

References

Further reading
 Ramon Marin. Las Fiestas Populares de Ponce. Editorial Universidad de Puerto Rico. 1994.
 Fay Fowlie de Flores. Ponce, Perla del Sur: Una Bibliográfica Anotada. Second Edition. 1997. Ponce, Puerto Rico: Universidad de Puerto Rico en Ponce. p. 335. Item 1668. 
 Ponce. Presupuesto municipal ordinario de gastos e ingresos para el año económico de 1891 a 1892. Ponce, Puerto Rico?: Tipografía El Vapor? s.f. (Universidad de Puerto Rico, Rio Piedras)

External links
 Guardia Civil española (c. 1898) (Includes military ranks in 1880s Spanish Empire.)

Mayors of Ponce, Puerto Rico
1830s births
1910s deaths
Year of death uncertain
Year of birth uncertain